Connect.com.au was one of the first commercial Internet service providers (ISP) to operate in Australia. The company was founded in 1991 by Hugh Irvine, Benjamin Golding and Joanne Davis, in conjunction with a small group of highly technical staff including Chris Chaundy.

From the outset Connect aimed for supplying high end Internet services to the corporate and wholesale market, marking a stark contrast to the many small ISPs which grew out of the PSTN Bulletin Board systems or the APANA nodes. In addition to the comprehensive commercial services, Connect also supplied some additional services to both the Australian and International communities.

Free DNS services were provided to various smaller nation-states on the sub-continent and throughout the Pacific Rim, in many cases being the primary authoritative server for these countries until they could provide their own infrastructure. Some of these countries include, but are not limited to, Fiji, Kiribati, Nepal and Micronesia. In May, 1994, Connect.com.au became the first ISP with a formal arrangement to use the university AARNet network as its internet backbone.

Within Australia Connect became the registry for the .net.au namespace to reduce some of the burden of these domain registrations from Robert Elz. This coincided roughly with the establishment of the .com.au registry, Melbourne IT. Connect provided .net.au domains free of charge until a policy change allowed the introduction of registration fees in 1997. Domains registered prior to this change remained free until the .au namespace was deregulated in 2002.

During 1997 and 1998 connect.com.au's new management lobbied the Australian Competition & Consumer Commission (ACCC) for equal standing with Telstra in relation to the inequities in the exchange of traffic between itself and Telstra, known as peering. Optus and OzEmail joined the connect.com.au ACCC initiated action. After two years of costly investigations and brinkmanship in 1998 the ACCC issued a competition notice Against Telstra, (the first ever issued against Telstra) requiring them to remedy the traffic imbalance and work with Connect.com.au, Optus and Ozemail to develop a traffic interconnection arrangement. The parties settled the dispute privately prior to the ACCC taking further action against Telstra.

Connect.com.au faced ongoing criticism from the ISP industry about the traffic peering arrangement with The "Big Four" ISPs at the time, Telstra, Optus, OzEmail and connect.com.au. The ISP community felt that connect.com.au had let them down by not passing on the full peering traffic benefit.  A group of ISP's sought to take action through the ACCC to require  the peering arrangement to be passed on. The ACCC declined to take action in the case. Connect.com.au was unable to get the message through to the ISP community that Connect.com.au had operated at a substantial loss since it was founded, and was struggling to maintain investor support. The financial settlement and the revised traffic pricing regime enabled Connect.com.au to secure ongoing support from its investors enabling the company to play a key role in assuring the future competitiveness of Australia's wholesale and business internet market and the ongoing financial health of ISP community.

Acquisition
In 1995 Connect was sold to three major investors: National Australia Bank, Sirius Technologies and AAPT. AAPT executive John Stuckey was appointed Chief Executive Officer in December 1996.

In 1999 AAPT acquired the remaining two thirds of Connect, making it a wholly owned subsidiary. Their aim was to consolidate existing business internet services with those provided by Connect and take advantage of the technically proficient technical team when launching their Smartchat brand. In 2000 AAPT was bought by Telecom New Zealand.

Founders
Following the sale of Connect in 1995, Hugh Irvine started an ICT and software development consultancy called Open Systems Consultants. This company specialises in the development and support of software for ISPs and Telecommunications providers, such as user administration and authentication software.

Chris Chaundy remained with Connect until the early 2000s, following which he joined Comindico. In 1999 both Irvine and Chaundy were inducted into the Australian Internet Awards' Hall of Fame.

References

External links
 Corporate site
 ASIC listing

Companies based in Melbourne
Internet service providers of Australia
Telecommunications companies established in 1991
1991 establishments in Australia